Studia philosophica is an annual peer-reviewed academic journal on philosophy. The journal was established in 1941. Issues appear in 4 different languages (German, French, English, and Italian).

See also 
 List of philosophy journals

References

External links 
 

German-language journals
English-language journals
French-language journals
Italian-language journals
Philosophy journals
Annual journals
Publications established in 1941